Zian Flemming (born 1 August 1998) is a Dutch professional footballer who plays as an attacking midfielder for EFL Championship club Millwall.

Club career

Jong Ajax
Flemming played in the youth departments of ZSGOWMS, RKSV Pancratius and Ajax. He made his professional debut for Jong Ajax on 1 September 2017 in a game against Jong PSV and scored on his debut. Flemming made 25 appearances during the 2017–18 season and won the Eerste Divisie title with Jong Ajax.

PEC Zwolle
On 2 May 2018, Flemming signed a three-year contract with PEC Zwolle, starting from 1 July 2018. There he made 28 appearances and six goals in his first season. His most notable performance came in the KNVB Cup against De Graafschap, where he scored four goals in a 5–2 victory.

Loan to NEC
On 2 September 2019, Flemming was sent on loan to NEC for the 2019–20 season, who were competing in the second-tier Eerste Divisie. On 13 September, he made his debut in the 2–2 away draw against FC Den Bosch. He scored his first two goals for NEC on 27 September, when the club drew 3–3 against Go Ahead Eagles. With 13 goals, he became club top scorer of NEC for the 2019–20 season. As the season ended, he returned to PEC Zwolle.

Fortuna Sittard
On 26 August 2020, Flemming signed a four-year contract with Eredivisie club Fortuna Sittard. He made his debut on 12 September in a 2–0 away loss to Twente. On 26 September, he scored his first two goals in a 3–3 home draw against AZ, one of them coming deep into injury time to secure the one point for Fortuna. He finished the season with 35 appearances, in which he scored 25 goals, as Fortuna finished in 11th place.

Millwall
On 25 June 2022, Flemming joined Championship club Millwall on a three-year contract for a fee of £1.7m.

Career statistics

Honours
Jong Ajax
 Eerste Divisie: 2017–18

References

External links
 
 

1998 births
Living people
Association football midfielders
Dutch footballers
Footballers from Amsterdam
Jong Ajax players
PEC Zwolle players
NEC Nijmegen players
Fortuna Sittard players
Millwall F.C. players
Eredivisie players
Eerste Divisie players
Dutch expatriate footballers
Expatriate footballers in England
Dutch expatriate sportspeople in England
English Football League players